Matthew Smith Anderson (1922–2006) was professor emeritus of international history at the London School of Economics.

Selected publications
 Britain's Discovery of Russia 1553–1815 (1958) 
 War and Society in Europe of the Old Regime, 1618–1789. (Fontana History of European War and Society)
 The Rise of Modern Diplomacy, 1450–1919
 Historians and eighteenth-century Europe, 1715–1789 (1979)
 Peter the Great (1995)
 Europe in the Eighteenth Century, 1713–1783 (1997)
 The Origins of the Modern European State System (1998)

References 

1922 births
2006 deaths
Academics of the London School of Economics
20th-century Scottish historians